Fiona Bourke (born 16 October 1988, Dannevirke) is a New Zealand rower.  She won the 2014 World Championship in the women's double sculls with Zoe Stevenson, having won the silver medal in the same team the year before.  At the 2012 Summer Olympics, she competed in the Women's quadruple sculls.  She was also part of the New Zealand women's quadruple sculls team that won bronze at the 2011 World Championships.  Bourke only took up rowing when she started university in 2007, at the University of Otago.

References

1988 births
Living people
New Zealand female rowers
Olympic rowers of New Zealand
Rowers at the 2012 Summer Olympics
World Rowing Championships medalists for New Zealand
Sportspeople from Dannevirke
University of Otago alumni
21st-century New Zealand women